Carol Estelle Bernoth (born 11 May 1938) is an Australian athlete. She competed in the women's high jump at the 1956 Summer Olympics.

References

External links
 
 
 
 
 
 

1938 births
Living people
Athletes (track and field) at the 1954 British Empire and Commonwealth Games
Athletes (track and field) at the 1956 Summer Olympics
Australian female high jumpers
Olympic athletes of Australia
Place of birth missing (living people)
Commonwealth Games competitors for Australia